is a Japanese voice actress from Tokyo, Japan. She appears as a main cast member in a number of Japanese anime series including as: Yukino in Nagasarete Airantō, Nana in Angel Tales,  Tomohane in Inukami, Akane Miura in Rocket Girls, and Tama Hieda in Shrine of the Morning Mist.

Filmography
Aishiteruze Baby as Namiko (ep 23)
Angel Tales as Inu no Nana (Dog)
Futakoi as Ruru Hinagiku
Futakoi Alternative as Ruru Hinagiku
Inukami! as Tomohane
Lucky Star as Yutaka Kobayakawa
Nagasarete Airantō as Yukino
Rocket Girls as Akane Miura
Shrine of the Morning Mist as Tama Hieda
Tenshi no Shippo Chu! as Dog Nana
Whistle! as Miyuki Sakurai
Sumomomo Momomo as Koganei Tenchi
Onegai My Melody as Harumi
Whispered Words as Kiyoka
Lilpri Manatsu Natsume

Live-action roles
Negima! Magister Negi Magi as Misora Kasuga

References

External links

1988 births
Living people
Japanese video game actresses
Japanese voice actresses
Voice actresses from Tokyo